Bonkle is a village 3 miles (4.8 km) north-east of Wishaw in North Lanarkshire, Scotland. It is sited on the east bank of the South Calder Water. Murdostoun Castle is located nearby.

See also
 Murdostoun
 South Calder Water
 North Lanarkshire
 Scotland

References

External links 

 Bonkle Village and Church website
 History of Bonkle

Villages in North Lanarkshire
Wishaw